The India Open is an annual badminton event which has been held in India since 2008 and is a BWF World Tour Super 750 international badminton tournament. Its first three editions were designated as Grand Prix Gold events. In 2011, it was upgraded to the BWF Superseries tournament. Since then until 2019, it was held annually at the Siri Fort Sports Complex, New Delhi. BWF categorised India Open as one of the seven BWF World Tour Super 500 events as per new BWF events structure since 2018. The India Open was upgraded to a BWF World Tour Super 750 event, effective from 2023.

Results

Performance by nation

See also 
 Syed Modi International Badminton Championships
 Hyderabad Open (badminton)
 Odisha Open
 India International Challenge

References

External links 
 Official website

India Open (badminton)
Badminton tournaments in India